Mueang Pan is a district (amphoe) in the northern part of Lampang province, northern Thailand.

Geography
Neighboring districts are (from the north clockwise) Wiang Pa Pao of Chiang Rai province, Wang Nuea, Chae Hom, and Mueang Lampang of Lampang Province, and Mae On and Doi Saket of Chiang Mai province.

The Phi Pan Nam Mountains dominate the landscape of the district.

History
The minor district (king amphoe) Mueang Pan was established on 15 July 1981, when the four tambons Mueang Pan, Chae Son, Ban Kho, and Thung Kwao were split off from Chae Hom district. On 9 May 1992 it was upgraded to a full district.

Administration
The district is divided into five subdistricts (tambons), which are further subdivided into 53 villages (mubans). There are no municipal (thesaban) areas. There are five tambon administrative organizations (TAO).

References

External links
amphoe.com

Mueang Pan